Jakkrit Panichpatikum (January 31, 1973 – October 19, 2013) was a Thai sport shooter who competed in the men's 10 metre air pistol, men's 50m pistol, and men's 25m rapid fire pistol.

At the 2012 Summer Olympics, he finished 37th in the qualifying round for the 10 metre air pistol event.  He finished in 14th in the qualifying round for the 50 metre pistol competition and 15th in the qualifying round for the men's 25 metre rapid fire pistol.

Assassination 
He was shot to death on October 19, 2013, at age of 40 after being attacked as he sat in his car, police said.  On television the following month, his mother-in-law confessed responsibility for his assassination, which she said she had arranged in order to free her daughter, Dr. Nitiwadee Pucharoenyos, from spousal abuse which he had allegedly been inflicting for several years.

Royal decoration 
 2005 -  Commander (Third Class) of The Most Admirable Order of the Direkgunabhorn

References

1973 births
2013 deaths
Jakkrit Panichpatikum
Jakkrit Panichpatikum
Shooters at the 1996 Summer Olympics
Shooters at the 2004 Summer Olympics
Shooters at the 2008 Summer Olympics
Shooters at the 2012 Summer Olympics
Asian Games medalists in shooting
Deaths by firearm in Thailand
Jakkrit Panichpatikum
Jakkrit Panichpatikum
Shooters at the 1994 Asian Games
Shooters at the 1998 Asian Games
Shooters at the 2002 Asian Games
Shooters at the 2006 Asian Games
Jakkrit Panichpatikum
Medalists at the 1994 Asian Games
Medalists at the 2006 Asian Games
Jakkrit Panichpatikum
Jakkrit Panichpatikum
Jakkrit Panichpatikum
Southeast Asian Games medalists in shooting
Competitors at the 2007 Southeast Asian Games